Dennis and Gnasher (or Dennis the Menace and Dennis the Menace and Gnasher) is a British animated television series based on characters from The Beano comic, which was broadcast on BBC from 2 April 1996 until 7 May 1998. Reruns aired on CBBC until January 2009. The series was produced by Collingwood O'Hare Productions and D.C. Thomson & Co. in association with BBC Television, alongside Flextech and PolyGram Video for the first season only. It was distributed by HIT Entertainment worldwide and was directed and largely written by Tony Collingwood.

Characters

Main
Dennis (voiced by Richard Pearce) is the main character, Dennis is a 10-year-old troublemaker and mischievous young boy. While most of his mischief is for fun, sometimes it can cause serious problems, or even help others. Dennis' antics have caused him to gain multiple enemies including his next-door neighbour Walter, the Colonel, and Sergeant Slipper. Dennis has saved the world on one occasion and appeared on Blue Peter after winning an art competition ("The Competition").  One of his favourite TV shows is "Nick Kelly" (a character who featured in another D.C. Thomson & Co. comic).
Gnasher (voiced by Kerry Shale) is Dennis's pet dog, an Abyssinian wire-haired tripe hound. He is Dennis's "partner in crime" twenty-four hours a day, seven days a week together they are the proverbial "two peas in a pod". When Gnasher is not by Dennis's side, like during school hours (though he does follow Dennis to school in the mornings), he'll have taken up his vigil, hiding in the front garden, ready and waiting to ambush the postman as he attempts to deliver the mail on Gnasher's watch. Gnasher's family still lives on the isle of Abyssinia, as revealed in "The Trial", when a company had accused Gnasher of being a rat. Gnasher possesses a set of teeth that are capable of chewing through almost anything, hence his name. His favourite food is bones, and his favourite dog toy is his squeaky bone. In "Summer Holiday", Gnasher went by the alias of 'Norman' - in order to pass himself off as a baby to help the family find lodgings at a hotel that forbids pets. In "Special Agent Dennis", it's revealed that Dennis feeds Gnasher his homework rather than actually do the homework.
Dennis' Dad (voiced by John Baddeley) is under a lot of stress due to Dennis' mischief; he often tries to discipline his son, with little results, and is forced to take extreme measures at times. He works in an office.
Dennis' Mum (voiced by Eve Karpf) seems to be able to cope more with Dennis' behaviour and on equal terms, Dennis listens to her when she tells him off. At times, she can be rather oblivious to events around her and silly at times, using household objects to help her when she takes driving lessons ("Menace Power").
Dennis's Granny, Gertrude (voiced by Sally Grace) Although she is eighty years old, Dennis's Granny is still very young at heart. Dennis loves his Granny, he defends her when another speaks ill of her ("Dennis and the Beanstalk") and will come to her for advice in times of need ("The Secret Diary"). In her youth, Dennis's Granny was every bit the Menace towards anything like a peaceful society in Beanotown that her grandson is today, as revealed in "The Secret Diary", and in her day there was a police officer, Sgt. Boot, who was the "Sgt. Slipper" to her "Dennis". According to information from the Beano comic, she is the mother of Dennis's Dad; in "The Secret Diary", when Dennis's Dad mentions more than once how well-behaved he was to his parents, he may have been referring particularly to his father because Dennis's Granny favours her grandson, Dennis, who takes after her. In "The Secret Diary", she was depicted as having black hair, like her son and grandson, but in "Gorilla Warfare", she was seen in a flashback with blond hair (so possibly she dyed it). She rides a motorcycle and eats pizza with "everything on them". She is perhaps the only adult, as mentioned by Dennis's Dad, "insane enough" to provide Dennis with any adult supervision and survive intact; she will even willingly come back for more of the fun and mayhem.
Curly (voiced by Jill Lidstone) is Dennis's best friend and fellow Menace. He is the loyal friend that will stand up for Dennis no matter what and can be considered his second-in-command.
Kevin "Pie-Face" (voiced by Gary Martin) is Dennis' other best friend and fellow Menace. Portrayed as being dim-witted and at times cowardly, as well as being a fan of pies (hence his nickname).
Walter the Softy (voiced by Judy Bennett) is Dennis' next-door neighbour, rival and major enemy. Always exasperated with Dennis' mischief and often tries to come up with ideas to humiliate and outshine him. But he is always unsuccessful as his plans tend to backfire.
Matilda (voiced by Eve Karpf) is Walter's best friend and girlfriend, often seen with him and swooning over him. Matilda will also give Walter cucumber sandwiches with the crust cut off on their picnics.
Sgt. Slipper (voiced by Colin McFarlane) is a local policeman and another enemy of Dennis, usually being the first one to deal with Dennis' antics outside his house, and often is seen with the Colonel. He is a bit clumsy at times and often overreacts to things. However, considering that there have been occasions where he and Dennis have encountered a common enemy, there have also been times when he proves himself to be extremely responsible, adept (enough to both take on the role of judge and pilot a police aircraft in 'The Trial') and effective at his job.
The Colonel, Godfrey; voiced by John Baddeley A neighbour of Dennis' family who lives across the road. He is a stereotypical military veteran who is forever seen in military uniform, his house resembles a military bunker and he even has a tank parked in his front garden. Likely, he is still in active (albeit limited) service, as he is occasionally seen conducting meetings at the nearby military base and is sometimes accompanied by a platoon of soldiers to tackle an opponent (usually Dennis). The Colonel often recalls memorable battles in his life and is considered an enemy of sorts by Dennis. However, there are occasions when the both of them join forces against a common enemy, such as in the episode 'The Trial', during which they, along with Sergeant Slipper and the Colonel's cousin Hugo, set off to find Gnasher (after the Colonel had made a false accusation against him).
Foo Foo is Walter's pet poodle and Gnasher's rival. She has been seen in a few episodes with Walter holding her while he's scolding Dennis. She tries to beat Gnasher at his own game but fails. Even though she does not appear as often as her master, Foo Foo is a minor antagonist.

Minor and guests 
Mrs. Pie Face, Kevin Pie Face's Mum (voiced by Jill Lidstone)
Mr. Pie Face, Kevin Pie Face's Dad (voiced by Gary Martin)
The Postman (voiced by John Baddeley) Like in the comic, the Postman is mostly harassed by Gnasher whenever he tries to deliver the mail to Dennis' House.
Rasher is Dennis' pet pig that made a cameo in the episode Dennis and the Beanstalk.
Sidney is Dennis' spider based on the comic book spider Dasher that with his web saved the day. Seen in Secret Agent Dennis.
Walter's Dad (voiced by Gary Martin)
School Headmaster (voiced by Colin McFarlane)
Flossy Muggins (voiced by Sally Grace) is a wacky inventor who helped Dennis build some ingenious inventions. Seen in Revenge of the Robot.
Dirk Cool, Secret Agent (voiced by Gary Martin) Seen in Special Agent Dennis.
Aunt Beryl is Gran's sister.
Hugo (voiced by Simon Callow) is the Colonel's adventurer cousin who helped Dennis and the others save Gnasher and other Abyssinian tripe hounds from the rat catchers. Seen in The Trial.
Mr Smiley (voiced by Derek Nimmo) is a nutty psychiatrist, who tried Dennis like practical jokes on the parents during his course on "How to Understand Children", but couldn't get the better of Dennis even though the parents thought he was worse than him. Seen in Dennis and the Grown-Ups
Slasher Brown (voiced by Denis Quilley) is Walter's twisted uncle, who runs the barbershop. Seen in Hair Today, Gone Tomorrow as the main antagonist.
Reg Trademark (voiced by John Baddeley) is an eccentric inventor who makes insane and useless gadgets. He builds a shopping mall and uses subliminal messages to make the customers buy his on sale gadgets. Seen in Malled.
Bertie Blenkinsop is a fellow softy and friend of Walter. Seen in Snowbound.
Spotty Perkins is a fellow softy and friend of Walter. Seen in Snowbound.
Captain Trout (voiced by Billy Connolly) is a sailor who enlists Dennis and the gang as the crew aboard his ship, the S.S. Rustbucket. Despite managing to capture the boys' interest when he relates to them how he lost his father, Captain Prefab to a whale known as Dopey Mick (a parody of Moby Dick) Captain Trout is essentially a strict, no-nonsense person - which results in Dennis very quickly losing all respect for him when he discovers this! However, he is grateful to the gang for their role in helping him be reunited with his father, and when they help him escape from the whale. Both captains appear in Dennis Ahoy! Captain Prefab later appears in a non-speaking cameo role in Summer Holiday.

Episodes
During the series' credits, the guest stars were always at the top before the regular cast.

Series 1 (1996)

Series 2 (1998)
For this series, the animation team switched from traditional cel-animation to digital ink-and-paint, making the motions appear much smoother.

Revival series

A new television series has now been produced. The new series features the return of Dennis, Gnasher, Mum, Dad, Curly and Pie-Face and also features the introduction of Dennis' little sister Bea. The production shots also showed Dennis' treehouse with a more menacing design. Screenshots and an episode can be found at the production company Red Kite Animation's website.

The show used to be shown at 4.00 pm from Monday-Friday on CBBC.

Release

Broadcast
The series initially aired on BBC and CBBC, with the latter channel airing it until 2009 when it was replaced with a revival series, it also later started airing on TCC and Fox Kids. In the US, the series aired on Sprout from 2005-2006, it was removed due to the channel wanting to focus more on preschool programming. Internationally, it aired on RTL 7 in Poland, NCRV and NPO Zappelin in the Netherlands, Super RTL in Germany, Italia 1 in Italy, and SBT in Brazil.

Home Media
Episodes 1-4 of series one are available in two, separate volumes each containing two episodes. The further thirteen episodes are yet to be released. All 13 episodes of series two are available in three, separate volumes each containing four-five episodes. These were later re-released in a box-set alongside "The Beano Videostars" and "The Beano Allstars". All 26 episodes the complete 2 series was released 22 August 2011 in a DVD boxset titled Dennis & Gnasher: Special Agent Dennis & 25 More Crazy Adventures (8 Discs), it also contains "The Beano Videostars" and "The Beano Allstars" on 22 August 2011 which makes all episodes available on DVD.

Ratings (CBBC Channel)
Saturday 22 June 2002 - 40,000 (3rd most watched on CBBC that week)
Sunday 23 June 2002 - 30,000 (5th most watched on CBBC that week)

References

External links

1990s British children's television series
1996 British television series debuts
1998 British television series endings
1990s British animated television series
British children's animated comedy television series
English-language television shows
The Beano
Fox Kids
BBC children's television shows
Television shows based on comics
Television series by Mattel Creations
Television series by Universal Television
Animated television series about children
Animated television series about dogs
Dennis the Menace and Gnasher